Seclusion is the third album by the Scottish rock band Aereogramme. The album artwork was created by Aaron Turner.

Track listing
 "Inkwell" – 3:55
 "Dreams and Bridges" – 4:40
 "The Unravelling" – 10:58
 "I Don't Need Your Love" – 4:03
 "Lightning Strikes the Postman" (The Flaming Lips cover) – 3:29
 "Alternate Score" – 4:53

References

2004 albums
Aereogramme albums
Albums with cover art by Aaron Turner